Karmala Taluka is one of the 11 talukas of Solapur district in the Indian state of Maharashtra. Parts of the movie Sairat was shot in this taluka.

Demographic 
As of the 2001 census, Karmala taluka had a total population of 233,316 people, of whom 121195 were male. Karmala taluka consists of 6 villages occupying a total area of 1609.7 km2.

Karmala taluka has a population density of 145 persons per square kilometer.

See also
Aljapur
Arjunnagar
Bhagatwadi
Taratgaon
Vanjanwadi
Vihal
Wadgaon Kh
Wadgaon (N)
Warkatne
Washibe

References

External links
The official website of Solapur district

Talukas in Solapur district